Centrosomal protein of 152 kDa, also known as Cep152, is a protein that in humans is encoded by the CEP152 gene. It is the ortholog of the Drosophila melanogaster gene asterless (asl) and both are required  for centriole duplication.

References

External links

Further reading

Centrosome